This is a list of yearly Big Eight Conference football standings.

Big Eight standings

Missouri Valley Conference standings

Big Six Conference standings

Big Seven Conference standings

Big Eight Conference standings

References

Big Eight Conference
Standings